"Serpentine Fire" is a single by Earth, Wind & Fire which was issued in October 1977 by Columbia Records. The single rose to numbers 1 and 13 on the Billboard Hot Soul Songs and Hot 100 charts, respectively.

Overview
"Serpentine Fire" spent seven weeks atop the Billboard Hot Soul Songs chart and was named the R&B single of the year by Billboard. The song was produced by bandleader Maurice White for Kalimba Productions and arranged by Tom Tom 84. "Serpentine Fire" was composed by Maurice, Verdine White and Reginald 'Sonny' Burke. An instrumental version of "Serpentine Fire" was the b-side of this single. "Serpentine Fire" came off of EWF's 1977 album All 'n All.

During October 1977, the music video for "Serpentine Fire" was issued by Columbia.

Critical reception
The Guardian declared "songs such as Serpentine Fire and Jupiter run on sheer adrenaline". Ed Hogan of AllMusic called the tune "a poppin mid-tempo jam". Joe McEwen of Rolling Stone exclaimed "Serpentine Fire, a song about the spinal life-center philosophy of many Eastern religions, is a simple tango spiced by a subtle funk base and the incessant clanging of a cowbell." Phyl Garland of Stereo Review also described the song as "a high stepper guaranteed to set even the most sluggish soul into motion". Record World said that "The sound is the thing here, with percussion, guitars and brass creating an infectious rhythmic environment for a basic, frequently-repeated lyric."

Charts

Accolades
The information regarding accolades attributed to "Serpentine Fire" is adapted from Acclaimed Music.

(*) designates lists that are unordered.

Cover versions

Nathan East version featuring Philip Bailey, Verdine White and Ralph Johnson

In December 2016, bass guitarist Nathan East released a cover of "Serpentine Fire" featuring Philip Bailey, Verdine White and Ralph Johnson as a single via Yamaha Entertainment Group. The song reached No. 17 on the Billboard Smooth Jazz Songs chart.

Critical reception
Andy Kellman of AllMusic proclaimed "Serpentine Fire" gets an ornate update with Bailey and EW&F partners Verdine White and Ralph Johnson. Phil Collins' drums and Eric Clapton's guitar are dredged from the master recording of an abandoned project, lost for 25 years, that was found in Patti Austin's basement by East's engineer."

Charts

Other covers
"Serpentine Fire" has also been covered by artists such as Jimmy Smith on his 1978 album Unfinished Business and Tom Scott on his 1990 album Them Changes. Brian Culbertson covered the song on his 2003 album Come On Up and Jack DeJohnette recorded another version with Ravi Coltrane and Matthew Garrison for his 2015 album In Movement.

References

1977 songs
1977 singles
Earth, Wind & Fire songs
Columbia Records singles
Songs written by Verdine White
Songs written by Maurice White
Songs with music by Sonny Burke